The Fortress is a mountain located SE of Gusty Peak in the Kananaskis River Valley of Kananaskis Park of the Canadian Rockies. When viewed from Highway 40, the north face presents a fortress like appearance. The Fortress should not be confused with nearby Fortress Mountain.

The mountain was originally named Tower Mountain but was changed in 1957 to its current name so as not to be confused with Tower Mountain.


Climbing routes
The southwestern slopes can be scrambled from either the Chester Lake side or Headwall Lakes side. Both routes join at the Chester-Fortress col. From the col, a steep path ascends the remaining  to the summit. Only the final section of the summit block requires any real hands on scrambling. The Headwall Lakes approach takes longer but the scree slopes leading to the col are not as loose as the Chester Lake side, which  serves as a better descent route.

Climate
Based on the Köppen climate classification, The Fortress is located in a subarctic climate with cold, snowy winters, and mild summers.

See also 
 Fortress Mountain Resort 
 List of mountains in the Canadian Rockies

References

External links
 The Fortress weather site: Mountain Forecast

Photo gallery

Three-thousanders of Alberta
Alberta's Rockies